Beriah Brown (February 23, 1815 – February 8, 1900) was a newspaper publisher and politician who served as Mayor of Seattle, Washington, as well as a regent for both the University of Wisconsin–Madison and the University of Washington.

Background and Wisconsin years
Brown was born on February 23, 1815, in Canandaigua, New York.

A newspaper publisher by trade, Brown was a Democrat who served as Clerk and Recorder of Iowa County, Wisconsin, and was a member of the first board of regents of the University of Wisconsin–Madison. He was the roommate of Horace Greeley, his political opposite who later became a noted newspaper editor in New York City.

In 1858, he was an unsuccessful candidate for the United States House of Representatives from Wisconsin.

Move west 
He moved to California in 1862 and became well known for his pro-Confederacy views. As the editor of the daily Democratic Press in San Francisco, he amassed a large library; when news arrived of the assassination of Abraham Lincoln, a mob ransacked Brown's office and burned 20,000 volumes. He supported the establishment of a white supremacist colony in Sonora, Mexico, and opposed the Civil War.

Brown moved to the Pacific Northwest after the burning of his office and library, working at newspapers in Portland, Oregon, and Salem, Oregon, in the 1860s. He moved to Washington Territory and co-founded the territory's first newspaper, the Puget Sound Dispatch, in 1871. Brown was later president and chairman of the board of regents of the University of Washington and was Mayor of Seattle from 1878 to 1879.

Brown died on February 8, 1900, in Anaconda, Montana. He was buried at Lake View Cemetery in Seattle.

References

Politicians from Canandaigua, New York
People from Iowa County, Wisconsin
Mayors of Seattle
Washington (state) Democrats
Wisconsin Democrats
19th-century American newspaper publishers (people)
1815 births
1900 deaths
19th-century American politicians